James Earle Deese (1921–1999) was an American psychologist. He joined the faculty of the University of Virginia in 1970 after having taught for many years (since 1950) at Johns Hopkins University. During his tenure at Johns Hopkins, Deese became Chairman of the Psychology Department and also served a term as Chairman of the American Psychological Association.  Deese later became the Chairman of the Psychology Department at University of Virginia until his partial retirement, later remaining as professor emeritus. He received the Hugh Scott Hamilton award for his distinguished service.

Personal life
Deese, a 1/2 Lumbee Indian was born in Salt Lake City, Utah, on December 14, 1921.  James Deese's father was Thomas D. Deese, a full-blooded Lumbee Indian whose parents, James M. Deese and Sarah Jane Chavis were from Burnt Swamp N.C. Deese's mother, Serene Jane Johnson was from Wisconsin.  Deese was first cousin of American aerospace engineer and scientist James Henry Deese.  Deese was raised in Southern California and during his early college years, he worked as a page at the early television studios. Deese retained a love for Southern California—its geography, its culture and history his entire life. Deese married Ellin Ruth Krauss in 1948.

Ellin was raised in a Jewish family from New York.  Her father, Lawrence Krauss was a prominent government attorney in Washington D.C.  Ellin converted later in her life, eventually pursuing a Masters of Divinity and becoming an Episcopal Priest quite late in her life.   Ellin was Priest in Charge at Buck Mountain Episcopal Church in Earlysville, Virginia, where James eventually became the Church organist.  The couple met when James was teaching at the University of Wisconsin.  James and Ellin had 2 children, Elizabeth and James L. Deese.  Deese had a passionate love for classical music and enjoyed playing the piano from the time he was a child, well into his older age.  Deese also collected rare books.  He particularly loved 18th Century literature, and he also enjoyed late 19th Century and early 20th Century essayists.  At the time of his death in 1999 most of his extensive collection was donated, upon the wishes of his family, to the University of Virginia.

Deese died at his home in Charlottesville, Virginia in 1999, just three months before his wife also died.  The couple had just celebrated their 50th anniversary on Christmas Eve of 1998.

Interests
Deese attended Chapman College in Orange, CA, where he earned his B.A. degree in psychology.  Deese later earned his doctorate at Indiana University. Later in his career, Deese was honored with an honorary Doctorate from Chapman.  While attending Indiana University, Deese became fascinated by animal behavior and how it related to human behavior, particularly in the area of communication. He studied under B.F. Skinner and W. N. Kellogg.  Later, Deese moved more into the area of Psycho-Linguistics and worked with other early pioneers in that field such as Noam Chomsky.   Deese became mentor to many doctoral students who went on further to develop the field of learning, cognition, and language, such as Alfonso Caramazza, Leonard M. Horowitz, William P. Banks, Allyssa McCabe, and Herbert H. Clark.

Publications
Deese was revered by his students and highly respected by his peers. He has authored or partnered in 14 books addressing various aspects of the Psychology of Learning (several books authored by Deese or co-authored with Stewart Hulse) and later, Psycholinguistics.  A popular book from 1965 was called The Structure of Associations in Language and Thought (Johns Hopkins University Press, 1965).   Later, having branched out more into the area of Social Psychology, Deese wrote, American Freedom and the Social Sciences (Columbia University Press, 1985).   Deese and his wife Ellin Krauss Deese co-authored the popular student manual, How to Study, which remains in print and regularly used by Freshman College Students into the 21st Century.

1921 births
1999 deaths
20th-century American psychologists
American people of Lumbee descent
Psycholinguists
Chapman University alumni
University of Virginia faculty
People from Salt Lake City
Johns Hopkins University faculty